Daniel Near (1825 – October 26, 1890) was an Ontario political figure. He represented Welland in the Legislative Assembly of Ontario from 1879 to 1883 as a Liberal member.

He was born in Humberstone Township in 1825, the son of John Near, and grew up there. He married Elizabeth Cronmiller in 1851 and then, in 1855, Mary Harwisch, after his first wife died. He served five years as reeve of Humberstone and was also a justice of the peace. He died at Humberstone in 1890 at the age of 65.

References

External links 
The Canadian parliamentary companion and annual register, 1880, CH Mackintosh
Member's parliamentary history for the Legislative Assembly of Ontario
The History of the County of Welland, Ontario, its past and present (1887)

1825 births
1890 deaths
Ontario Liberal Party MPPs
People from Port Colborne